Alex Wiley (born June 5, 1993) is an American rapper from Chicago, Illinois. He released his first album Club Wiley in May 2013, followed by two more albums Village Party and Village Party 2: Heaven's Gates.

Musical career

1994-2010: Early life
Alex began interest in music in grade school when he began playing the violin. Soon after, he began making hip hop music. In high school, he joined a record imprint called "The Village" with Kembe X, Monster Mike, Isaiah Rashad, Jean Deaux, Spiff, and The Magician.

2011-present: Various mixtapes and build on his buzz
In November 2015, Wiley released Village Party 2: Heaven's Gate. The album includes a guest feature from Chance the Rapper and Kembe X. The album received high acclaim, eventually ranking among the top 40 albums on iTunes. Since then, Wiley has also worked with other highly acclaimed artists such as Hoodie Allen, Vic Mensa, and more.

Alex was featured on Chance the Rapper's 2016 song "Grown Ass Kid." However, due to clearance issues and the leaking of the song prior to the release, the song was not included on Chance's mixtape, Coloring Book.

Discography

Extended plays

Mixtapes

References

Living people
African-American male rappers
Midwest hip hop musicians
American hip hop singers
1993 births
Rappers from Chicago
21st-century American rappers
21st-century American male musicians
21st-century African-American musicians